In enzymology, a digalactosyldiacylglycerol synthase is an enzyme that catalyzes the chemical reaction

UDP-galactose + 3-(beta-D-galactosyl)-1,2-diacyl-sn-glycerol  UDP + 3-[alpha-D-galactosyl-(1->6)-beta-D-galactosyl]-1,2-diacyl-sn- glycerol

Thus, the two substrates of this enzyme are UDP-galactose and 3-(beta-D-galactosyl)-1,2-diacyl-sn-glycerol, whereas its 3 products are UDP, [[3-[alpha-D-galactosyl-(1->6)-beta-D-galactosyl]-1,2-diacyl-sn-]], and glycerol.

This enzyme belongs to the family of glycosyltransferases, specifically the hexosyltransferases.  The systematic name of this enzyme class is UDP-galactose:3-(beta-D-galactosyl)-1,2-diacyl-sn-glycerol 6-alpha-galactosyltransferase. Other names in common use include DGD1, DGD2, DGDG synthase (ambiguous), UDP-galactose-dependent DGDG synthase, UDP-galactose-dependent digalactosyldiacylglycerol synthase, and UDP-galactose:MGDG galactosyltransferase.  This enzyme participates in glycerolipid metabolism.

References

 
 
 
 

EC 2.4.1
Enzymes of unknown structure